Manomera is a genus of walkingsticks in the family Diapheromeridae. There are at least three described species in Manomera.

Species
These three species belong to the genus Manomera:
 Manomera blatchleyi (Caudell, 1905) i c g b (blatchley walkingstick)
 Manomera brachypyga Rehn and Hebard, 1914 i c g
 Manomera tenuescens (Scudder, 1900) i c g b (slender-bodied walkingstick)
Data sources: i = ITIS, c = Catalogue of Life, g = GBIF, b = Bugguide.net

References

Further reading

 

Phasmatodea
Articles created by Qbugbot